The 2010 Tro-Bro Léon was the 27th edition of the Tro-Bro Léon cycle race and was held on 18 April 2010. The race was won by Jérémy Roy.

General classification

References

2010
2010 in road cycling
2010 in French sport